Springtime (lit. When Spring Comes) is a 2004 South Korean film starring Choi Min-sik as a struggling musician who takes a job as a music teacher in a rural mining town outside of Seoul.

Plot
To trumpeter Hyun-woo, life seems to remain forever locked in winter. In desperation, Hyunwoo signs up for a position teaching a children's wind ensemble at a small junior high school in a distant Dogye village. Worn-out instruments, tarnished trophies and frayed certificates testify to the poor conditions of this ragtag group. This leads Hyun-woo, together with his students, to take on a seemingly impossible challenge.

Awards and nominations
2004 Blue Dragon Film Awards
 Best Music - Jo Seong-woo
 Nomination – Best Actor - Choi Min-sik
 Nomination – Best New Actress - Jang Shin-young

2004 Korean Film Awards
 Nomination – Best Actor - Choi Min-sik
 Nomination – Best Supporting Actress – Youn Yuh-jung
 Nomination – Best Music - Jo Seong-woo
 Nomination – Best New Director – Ryu Jang-ha
 Nomination – Best New Actor - Kim Kang-woo

References

External links 
 
 
 
 
 
 

2004 films
2004 drama films
South Korean drama films
Films about educators
Films set in Gangwon Province, South Korea
Films directed by Ryu Jang-ha
2000s Korean-language films
2000s South Korean films